Robinson in Ruins is a 2010 British documentary film by Patrick Keiller and narrated by Vanessa Redgrave. It is a sequel to Keiller's previous films, London (1994) and Robinson in Space (1997). It documents the journey of the fictional title character around the south of England. It premiered at the 67th Venice International Film Festival in September 2010.

Overview
Vanessa Redgrave assumes the role of narrator, after the death of Paul Scofield, C.H., C.B.E., who had narrated the previous films. Redgrave takes the part of the previous narrator's former lover. Similarly to her predecessor she guides us through the adventures of the unseen title character, Robinson. There is a special focus on the importance of nature as we are guided through the picturesque surroundings of Oxfordshire and Berkshire. Keiller weaves the surreal, philosophy, architecture, the arts, science, politics, history and agriculture in this exploration of the natural world.

Release
The World Premiere was on 4 September at the 67th Venice International Film Festival. It was also screened at the New York Film Festival on 26 September 2010. It was released and distributed by the British Film Institute on 19 November 2010.

References

External links
 

British mockumentary films
Films shot in England
2010 films
2010 documentary films
2010s English-language films
2010s British films